Stenailurus is an extinct genus of machairodont saber-toothed cat from the Late Miocene of Spain. It contains a single species, Stenailurus teilhardi .

External links

Metailurini
Miocene carnivorans
Prehistoric carnivoran genera